John Winston may refer to:

John A. Winston (1812–1871), Governor of Alabama
John Winston (actor) (1927–2019), English actor